Cameron Taylor-Britt (born October 15, 1999) is an American football cornerback for the Cincinnati Bengals of the National Football League (NFL). He played college football at Nebraska.

Early life and high school
Taylor-Britt grew up in Montgomery, Alabama and attended Park Crossing High School, where he played quarterback. As a senior, he completed 77 of 130 passing attempts for 1,466 yards and 14 touchdowns and rushed for 1,030 yards and 16 touchdowns on 117 carries. Taylor-Britt initially hoped to play college football at Auburn and was recruited by the school, but was not ultimately offered a scholarship. He ultimately committed to play at Nebraska.

College career
Taylor-Britt played in 11 games as a freshman on both defense and special teams and finished the season with 12 total tackles, three passes broken up, and a recovered fumble while on punt coverage. He started seven games at safety and three games at cornerback in his sophomore season. Taylor-Britt was named to the second-team All-Big Ten Conference after starting all seven of Nebraska's games in the team's COVID-19-shortened 2020 season and recorded 28 tackles with four passes broken up and two interceptions. He repeated as a second-team All-Big Ten selection after finishing his senior season with 51 tackles, three tackles for loss, 11 passes broken up, one interception, and one blocked kick.

Professional career

Taylor-Britt was drafted by the Cincinnati Bengals in the second round (60th overall) in the 2022 NFL Draft. He was placed on injured reserve on August 30, 2022 with an abdomen injury. He was activated on October 8.

References

External links
 Cincinnati Bengals bio
Nebraska Cornhuskers bio

1999 births
Living people
Players of American football from Montgomery, Alabama
American football cornerbacks
Nebraska Cornhuskers football players
Cincinnati Bengals players